Carposina impavida is a moth in the family Carposinidae. It was described by Edward Meyrick in 1913. It is found on the Comoros and in the Democratic Republic of the Congo.

The larvae feed on Mallotus oppositifolius and Maesobotrya species.

References

Carposinidae
Moths described in 1913
Moths of Africa